Greatest Hits is a compilation album by the hip-hop group Geto Boys, released in 2002. It is the second compilation album released by Geto Boys (the other was Uncut Dope in 1992). Greatest Hits contains a bonus DVD in some copies and has songs from all of the Geto Boys' albums released up to 2002, from  Making Trouble (1988) to Da Good da Bad & da Ugly (1998). There is also a song that had never appeared on any other Geto Boys album, "The Answer to Baby (Mary II)"; this also appeared in group member Scarface's compilation album, Balls and My Word (2003).

Track listing
 Balls and My Word
 Scarface
 Mind Playin' Tricks
 Straight Gangstaism
 Six Feet Deep
 World Is a Geto
 Geto Boys and Girls
 Let a Hoe Be a Hoe
 It Ain't
 Mind of a Lunatic
 Chuckie
 Trigga Happy Nigga
 Crooked Officer
 Gangsta (Put Me Down)
 Damn It Feels Good To Be a Gangsta
 Geto Fantasy
 Answer to Baby (Mary II)

References

Geto Boys albums
2002 greatest hits albums
Albums produced by Mike Dean (record producer)
Gangsta rap compilation albums